KYLS-FM (95.9 FM, "Froggy 96") is a radio station broadcasting a new country music format. Licensed to Ironton, Missouri, United States, the station is currently owned by Dockins Communications, Inc and features programming from Fox News Radio.

History
The Federal Communications Commission issued a construction permit for the station to Dockins Communications, Inc. on October 19, 1983. The station was assigned the call letters KYLS on December 5, 1983, and received its license to cover on September 24, 1984. On August 11, 1997, the station changed its call sign to the current KYLS-FM. The station's license is assigned to Dockins.

References

External links

Dockins Broadcast Group Website

YLS-FM
Country radio stations in the United States
Radio stations established in 1984